Adam Wicheard (born 23 August 1985) is an English professional snooker player, who has competed professionally between 2010 and 2012.

Career

He was selected to compete in the World Under-21s in 2005 and was progressing towards turning professional, until he experienced severe back pains while competing at a festival in Pontins. An MRI scan revealed he had a ruptured tumour in his spine which required an emergency 7-hour operation, followed by 6 months of recovery in hospital with Wicheard lying flat in bed unable to move for the first 4 months. He was warned by doctors he may never walk again, but fought back by undergoing extensive physiotherapy and would later finish first in the 2009/10 English rankings to turn professional for the following season.

However, Wicheard failed to perform well enough during the season to automatically retain his place on the World Snooker Tour, but did win all his matches at the 2011 World Snooker Q School to earn a berth for the 2011/12 season. In February 2012, he qualified for the main stage of a ranking event for the very first time by coming through four qualification matches, culminating with a 4–2 victory over world number 22 Marcus Campbell to reach the last 32 of the Welsh Open. He played Stephen Maguire and got to 2–3 having been 0–3 down, but lost the seventh frame and bowed out of the tournament. In the remainder of the season Wicheard could only win one more qualifying match and finished the year without a ranking, meaning he entered Q School in a bid to earn a place to play the 2012–13 season. Wicheard played in all three Q School events but could not win enough games in any of them and dropped off the main snooker tour. Confined to entering Players Tour Championship events for the 2012/2013 season, Wicheard played in nine of them, with his best results coming in European Tour Event 5 and Event 6 where he lost in the second round to Jimmy Robertson and Ken Doherty respectively. He finished the season 97th on the PTC Order of Merit. Wicheard reached the final round of Q School to stand one win away from rejoining the tour. He was 3–2 down to Chris Wakelin, before his cue of 15 years snapped in half which forced him to concede the match.

Wicheard's high Q School Order of Merit placing enabled him to play in the qualifying rounds of five ranking tournaments in the 2013–14 season. The only one he reached was the 2014 World Open by beating Liu Chuang 5–2, but he was whitewashed 5–0 by Mark Davis in the first round. He received automatic entry into the Welsh Open and was defeated 4–3 by Matthew Stevens in the first round. Wicheard entered Q School at the end of the season but could only win one match in the two events. He has not played in a professional event since.

References

External links

Global Snooker Profile
Pro Snooker Blog Profile

English snooker players
1985 births
Living people
Sportspeople from Bath, Somerset